The ARSAERO CT 10, also known as the Arsenal/SFECMAS Ars 5501, was a remote-controlled target drone developed by the Arsenal de l'Aéronautique (ARSAERO) for the French Air Force. It was developed as a copy of the German V-1 flying bomb and was used to simulate bombers for training anti-aircraft artillery crews and fighter pilots.

History
The CT 10's design process began in August 1946 with reverse-engineering of V-1 missile stocks captured from the Luftwaffe. It was first launched from the Centre interarmées d'essais d'engins spéciaux missile range near Colomb-Bechar, Algeria, in December 1949 and became operational in 1952. It was mass-produced by Nord in Châtillon and Villeurbanne. More than 400 copies were eventually built. The CT 10 was used primarily by France, though the United Kingdom, Italy, and Sweden used it as well. It was retired from French service during the 1950s in favour of more advanced derivatives such as the CT20 and CT41 but was still in widespread use by the British and Swedish air forces throughout the 1960s.

Design
The CT 10 was ground-launched or air-launched. When ground-launched, it would be propelled down a launch ramp by a pair of solid rockets. When air-launched, it would be released from a LeO 45 bomber. It was then engaged by fighter aircraft or ground-based guns and missiles.

The CT 10's design is largely identical to that of the V-1 missile it was based on. However, there were some important differences between the two:
 The CT 10 was scaled-down from the V-1: it is 6 m long, versus 8.32 m for the V-1.
 The CT 10 was propelled down its launch ramp by a pair of solid rocket boosters, which had more thrust than the liquid-fueled Dampferzeuger ("Steam generator") used to launch the V-1. This allowed the CT 10's launch ramp to be considerably shorter.
 The CT 10 was designed to be recovered, and therefore carried a parachute.
 The CT 10 was radio-guided from a nearby ground station.

Surviving examples
A CT 10 is displayed in the Overlord Museum in Colleville-sur-Mer, France.

Specifications

See also

References

1950s French special-purpose aircraft
Target drones of France
Pulsejet-powered aircraft
Aircraft first flown in 1949